The 2022 South Point 400 was a NASCAR Cup Series race held on October 16, 2022, at Las Vegas Motor Speedway in Las Vegas. Contested over 267 laps on the  asphalt intermediate speedway, it was the 33rd race of the 2022 NASCAR Cup Series season, the seventh race of the Playoffs, and the first race of the Round of 8.

Report

Background

Las Vegas Motor Speedway, located in Clark County, Nevada outside the Las Vegas city limits and about 15 miles northeast of the Las Vegas Strip, is a  complex of multiple tracks for motorsports racing. The complex is owned by Speedway Motorsports, Inc., which is headquartered in Charlotte, North Carolina.

Entry list
 (R) denotes rookie driver.
 (i) denotes driver who is ineligible for series driver points.

Practice

Practice results

Qualifying

Qualifying results

Race

Stage Results

Stage One
Laps: 80

Stage Two
Laps: 85

Final Stage Results

Stage Three
Laps: 102

Race statistics
 Lead changes: 18 among 11 different drivers
 Cautions/Laps: 8 for 42 laps
 Red flags: 0
 Time of race: 3 hours, 4 minutes and 10 seconds
 Average speed:

Penalties
On October 18, NASCAR handed Bubba Wallace a one-race suspension for an intentional retaliatory right-rear hook collision against Kyle Larson that collected playoff contender Christopher Bell and resulted in physical confrontation between Wallace and Larson. Wallace was the first driver since Matt Kenseth in 2015 (as a result of intentionally crashing into Joey Logano at that year's Martinsville playoff race) to be parked by NASCAR for on-track conduct; John Hunter Nemechek replaced Wallace for the Dixie Vodka 400.

Media

Television
NBC Sports covered the race on the television side. Rick Allen, Jeff Burton, Steve Letarte and Dale Earnhardt Jr. called the race from the broadcast booth. Dave Burns, Parker Kligerman and Marty Snider handled the pit road duties from pit lane.

Radio
The Performance Racing Network covered their final 2022 broadcast, which was also simulcast on Sirius XM NASCAR Radio. Doug Rice and Mark Garrow called the race from the booth when the field raced through the tri-oval. Nick Yeoman called the race from a billboard in turn 2, as he noted, at the Dan Wheldon memorial plaque    when the field raced through turns 1 and 2 & Pat Patterson called the race from a billboard outside of turn 3 when the field raced through turns 3 and 4. Heather Debeaux, Brett McMillan, Brad Gillie and Wendy Venturini handled the duties on pit lane.

Standings after the race

Drivers' Championship standings

Manufacturers' Championship standings

Note: Only the first 16 positions are included for the driver standings.

References

South Point 400
South Point 400
South Point 400
NASCAR races at Las Vegas Motor Speedway